is a junction railway station in the city of Kamaishi, Iwate, Japan, operated by East Japan Railway Company (JR East) and the Third-sector Sanriku Railway.

Lines
It is an intermediate station for the Sanriku Railway's Rias Line. The station was formerly also a terminal station for the Sanriku Railway's Minami-Rias Line and the JR East Yamada Line; however, rail operations have remained suspended since the  2011 Tōhoku earthquake and tsunami on 11 March 2011. The Minami-Rias Line between Yoshihama and Kamaishi resumed on 5 April 2014. Yamada line reopened on 23 March 2019 with operations transferred to the Sanriku Railway. Then, it joined up with the Kita-Rias Line on one side and the Minami-Rias Line on the other, which together constitutes the entire Rias Line.

Station layout
Kamaishi Station has a side platform and two island platform serving five tracks, connected to the station building by an underground passage. The station has a Midori no Madoguchi staffed ticket office.

Platforms

History

Kamaishi Station opened on 17 September 1939. The Kamakishi Line began operations from 11 October 1944. The station also became a terminal station for the Miyako Line on 27 February 1972. This line was privatized on 1 April 1987, becoming the Sanriku Railway South Rias Line. Kamaishi Station was absorbed into the JR East network upon the privatization of the Japanese National Railways (JNR) on 1 April 1987. The 2011 Tōhoku earthquake and tsunami on 11 March 2011 destroyed much of the tracks and many stations of the Yamada Line between Miyako and Kamaishi. In February 2012, JR East officially proposed that this section of the Yamada Line be scrapped and the right-of-way used as a bus rapid transit (BRT) route  but this decision was subsequently overturned and the line restored pending transfer to the Sanriku Railway. On 23 March 2019, the Yamada Line section from Miyako to Kamaishi was reopened and transferred to Sanriku Railway. This joined up with the Kita-Rias Line on one side and the Minami-Rias Line on the other which together constitutes the entire Rias Line. Accordingly, this station became an intermediate station of the Rias Line.

Passenger statistics
In fiscal 2018, the JR East portion of the station was used by an average of 233 passenger daily (boarding passengers only). The Sanriku Railway portion of the station was used by 113 passengers during the same period.

Surrounding area
 Kamaishi City Office 
 Kamaishi Post Office

See also
 List of railway stations in Japan

References

External links

  (JR East) 
 Kamaishi Station information (Sanriku Railway) 

Railway stations in Iwate Prefecture
Rias Line
Kamaishi Line
Railway stations in Japan opened in 1939
Kamaishi, Iwate
Stations of East Japan Railway Company